IBM Cloud, (formerly known as Bluemix) is a set of cloud computing services for business offered by the information technology company IBM.

Services 

As of 2021, IBM Cloud contains more than 170 services including compute, storage, networking, database, analytics, machine learning, and developer tools.

History

SoftLayer

SoftLayer Technologies, Inc. (now IBM Cloud) was a dedicated server, managed hosting, and cloud computing provider, founded in 2005 and acquired by IBM in 2013. SoftLayer initially specialized in hosting workloads for gaming companies and startups, but shifted focus to enterprise workloads after its acquisition.

SoftLayer had bare-metal compute offerings before other large cloud providers such as Amazon Web Services.

SoftLayer has hosted workloads for companies such as The Hartford, WhatsApp, Whirlpool, Daimler, and Macy's.

Timeline
 Year 2005: SoftLayer was established in 2005 by Lance Crosby and several of his ex-coworkers. 
 Year 2010 - August: GI Partners acquired a majority equity stake in SoftLayer in August 2010.
 Year 2010 - November: In November of that year it merged the company with The Planet Internet Services, SoftLayer's biggest competitor, and consolidated the customer base under the SoftLayer brand.
 Year 2011 - Q1: In Q1 2011, the company reported hosting more than 81,000 servers for more than 26,000 customers in locations throughout the United States.
 Year 2011 - July: In July 2011, the company announced plans for international expansion to Amsterdam and Singapore to add to the existing network of North American-based data centers in Dallas (Texas), San Jose (California), Seattle (Washington), Santiago de Querétaro (Mexico), Houston (Texas) and Washington, D.C. Most of these data centers were leased via Digital Realty.
 Year 2013 June 4: On June 4, 2013, IBM announced its acquisition of SoftLayer under undisclosed financial terms, in a deal that according to Reuters could have fetched more than $2 billion, to form an IBM Cloud Services Division. At the time of acquisition, SoftLayer was described as the biggest privately held cloud infrastructure provider (IaaS) in the world.
 Year 2015 - May: As of May 2015, the company has 23 data centers in 11 different countries.
 Year 2018: By 2018, SoftLayer was renamed to IBM Cloud.

Initial launch of Bluemix (2013-2016) 
In June 2013, IBM acquired SoftLayer, a public cloud platform, to serve as the foundation for its IaaS offering. Bluemix was announced for public beta in February 2014 after having been developed since early 2013. Bluemix was based on the open source Cloud Foundry project and ran on SoftLayer infrastructure. IBM announced the general availability of the Bluemix Platform-as-a-Service (PaaS) offering in July 2014.

By April 2015, Bluemix included a suite of over 100 cloud-based development tools "including social, mobile, security, analytics, database, and IoT (internet of things). Bluemix had grown to 83,000 users in India with growth of approximately 10,000 users each month.

A year after announcement, Bluemix had made little headway in the cloud-computing platform space relative to its competition, and remained substantially behind market leaders Microsoft Azure and Amazon AWS. By August 2016, little had changed in market acceptance of the Bluemix offering. In February 2016, IBM Bluemix includes IBM's Function as a Service (FaaS) system, or Serverless computing offering, that is built using open source from the Apache OpenWhisk incubator project largely credited to IBM for seeding. This system, equivalent to Amazon Lambda, Microsoft Azure Functions, Oracle Cloud Fn or Google Cloud Functions, allows calling of a specific function in response to an event without requiring any resource management from the developer.

Re-brand to IBM Cloud (2017–Present) 

In May 2017 IBM released Kubernetes support as the IBM Bluemix Container Service, later renamed to the IBM Cloud Kubernetes Service (IKS). IKS was built using the open source Kubernetes project. This system, equivalent to Amazon Web Services EKS, Microsoft Azure AKS, or Google Cloud GKE, aims to provide a platform for automating deployment, scaling, and operations of application containers across clusters of hosts. In October 2017, IBM announced that they would rebrand their cloud as IBM Cloud brand, merging all components, thus retiring the Bluemix and Softlayer brands. In March 2018, IBM launched an industry first managed Kubernetes service on bare metal. In August 2019, 3 weeks after the close of Red Hat acquisition, IBM launched a managed Red Hat OpenShift on IBM Cloud.

In November 2019, IBM has announced that it had designed the world's first financial services-ready public cloud and that Bank of America was its first committed collaborator and anchor customer, joined shortly thereafter in 2020 by BNP Paribas as its first Europeean anchor client. IBM announced in April 2021 the general availability of IBM Cloud for Financial Services, including support for Red Hat OpenShift and other cloud-native technologies. In July 2021, it was announced that SAP is onboarding two of its finance and data management solutions to IBM Cloud for Financial Services. In September 2021, it was CaixaBank's turn to boost digital capabilities with IBM Cloud for Financial Services and onboarding to new IBM Cloud Multizone Region in Spain.

Customer base 
In 2019, IBM partnered with the United States Tennis Association (USTA) to provide new AI-powered tools for the US Open.

In May 2020, IBM announced agreements with six European companies, including Osram and Crédit Mutuel, that use IBM Cloud to access advanced technologies such as AI, blockchain and analytics.

Reviews
IBM Cloud continued to be considered a leader in bare-metal in 2020, and distinguished itself by providing over 11 million possible custom configurations with the latest Power, Intel, and AMD CPUs and Nvidia GPUs.

Environmental impact 
In 2021, IBM announced it would achieve net zero greenhouse gas emissions by 2030.

References

External links 
 

Cloud computing providers
Cloud infrastructure
Cloud platforms
Web hosting